Serhiy Volodymyrovych Lyovochkin (born 17 July 1972) is a Ukrainian politician, currently a member of the Parliament of Ukraine. Over 20 years, he has held various leading posts in civil service as well as top corporate positions.

Early life
In 1989 he graduated from the prestigious Kyiv school and entered the Kyiv Institute of National Economy (since 1992 Kyiv National Economic University), where he studied until 1993 and received a degree in economics, specialty "Accounting, control and analysis of economic activity." Then there until 1997, a graduate student, Department of Finance; PhD thesis "of US government debt." Candidate of Sciences (1997). In 1999-2002 he studied at the Ukrainian Academy of Foreign Trade, from which he graduated with a master's degree in the specialty "International law".

In 2004 he defended his doctoral thesis on "The economic growth in the context of the Macro-financial stabilization in Ukraine." Author of more than 30 scientific papers, including 2 monographs. Associate Professor of the Department of Finance in the alma mater.

Career
He began his career immediately after finishing graduate school in 1996, deputy chairman of the private bank.

In 1996–1999, the executive director of the Foundation to promote socio-economic development of the Donetsk region.

Since 1999, he entered the civil service. In the 1998 elections, he ran for the deputies of Ukraine in the electoral district in Donetsk region, lost, taking 2nd place.

Lovochkin has worked in administration of President Leonid Kuchma (1999-2004) where he led Group of advisors and economy reforming staff.

In the 2006 Ukrainian parliamentary election he had failed to do so for Lytvyn Bloc (Lytvyn Bloc had won no seats).

In the 2007 Ukrainian parliamentary election Lovochkin was elected into the Ukrainian parliament for Party of Regions.

During his tenure as Head of Administration for President Victor Yanukovich (2010–2013), Mr. Lovochkin had implemented significant government initiatives, including Program for economy reforms, Chernobyl new sarcophagus Program, Program of non-proliferation of nuclear materials.

From 2011 to 2013 with liaison to Lyovochkin, Alan Friedman, Eckart Sager, who was a one time CNN producer, Rick Gates, Paul Manafort, and Manafort's senior aide Konstantin Kilimnik devised a strategy to discredit Yulia Tymoshenko along with Hillary Clinton. This effort supported the pro-Russia administration of then President of Ukraine Viktor Yanukovych and his Party of Regions, especially during the parliamentary elections in the fall of 2012.

On 30 November 2013, Lovochkin submitted a resignation letter as a gesture of disagreement with the violent actions against Maidan activists.

On 1 February 2013, Lovochkin and his business associate Dmytro Vasylovych Firtash, a Ukrainian natural gas magnate, purchased Ukraine's Inter Media Group which owns the Ukrainian News and Inter television network, one of the most watched television channels in Ukraine.

In 2014 after the revolutionary events of Euromaidan and to replace of the Progressive Democratic Party, he created a new party, the Party of Development of Ukraine which has the same abbreviation in the Ukrainian language as the Party of Regions.

In September 2014, Paul Manafort traveled to Ukraine and supported the creation of a new Ukrainian political party Opposition Bloc.

On 15 September 2014, following Manafort's advice, Lyovochkin's Party of Development of Ukraine united with 5 other parties to form the Opposition Bloc.

In the 2014 Ukrainian parliamentary election on 26 October, Lovochkin was re-elected into parliament placed 12th on the electoral list of Opposition Bloc.

Lovochkin stated in October 2014 that Crimea was annexed by Russia in March 2014 because Russian President Vladimir "Putin was betrayed by our irresponsible leaders too many times, until he stopped taking Ukraine seriously".

On 9 November 2018, Lovochkin's Party of Development of Ukraine co-chaired by Yuriy Boiko and the party For life led by Vadym Rabinovich signed a cooperation agreement for both the 2019 Ukrainian presidential election and the parliamentary election of the same year forming the Opposition Platform — For life. Lyovochkin was excluded from the Opposition Bloc faction (the reason given was) "because they betrayed their voters" interests on 20 November 2018.

Lovochkin was re-elected, placed 5th on the party list of Opposition Platform — For Life this time, in the 2019 parliamentary election. His sister Yulia Lovochkin was also elected for the same party (22nd on the party list).

2016 Donald Trump campaign and Special Counsel investigation
In January 2019, Paul Manafort's lawyers submitted a filing to the court, in response to the Robert Mueller Special Counsel's accusation that Manafort had lied to investigators while supposedly co-operating with the investigation. Through an error in redacting, the document accidentally revealed that while Manafort was Donald Trump's campaign chairman, Manafort met with Konstantin Kilimnik, gave Kilimnik polling data related to Donald Trump's 2016 United States Presidential campaign, and discussed a Ukraine-Russia peace plan for the ongoing Russia invasion of Ukraine with Kilimnik. As a Russian Main Intelligence Directorate GRU agent, Konstantin Kilimnik is a known member of Russia's intelligence community. Although most of the polling data was reportedly public, some was private Trump campaign polling data managed by Brad Parscale. Manafort asked Kilimnik to pass the data to Ukrainians Rinat Akhmetov and Serhiy Lyovochkin.

Academic work
Lyovochkin is the founder of the New Ukraine Institute of Strategic Research. At this time, the institute is focusing on such areas as reforms in Ukraine, environmental and humanitarian issues, Minsk peace reestablishment process.

Mr. Lovochkin has a Doctor degree in Economics (2004) and has authored 35 publications on economic issues.

He defended his thesis on the topics “National Debt of the United States of America" (1997) and “Macro-financial Stabilization in the Context of Economic Growth in Ukraine" (2004).

See also
Timeline of investigations into Trump and Russia (2017)
Timeline of investigations into Trump and Russia (2019)

Notes

References

External links
 At Request of U.S., Austria Arrests Ukrainian Businessman. NY Times. 13 March 2014.
 Long-Time Yanukovych Loyalist Named Presidential Chief of Staff. RIA Novosti. 24 January 2014.

1972 births
Living people
Politicians from Kyiv
Party of Regions politicians
Opposition Bloc politicians
Sixth convocation members of the Verkhovna Rada
Eighth convocation members of the Verkhovna Rada
Ninth convocation members of the Verkhovna Rada
Kyiv National Economic University alumni
Head of the Presidential Administration of Ukraine